American rock band The Cab has released two studio albums, four extended plays, nine singles, and eight music videos. Their debut album, Whisper War, was released on April 29, 2008. They have been called "The Band You Need to Know 2008" by Alternative Press magazine. They were also featured in the '100 Bands You Need to Know in 2010' by the magazine and were one of the three bands featured on the cover page, along with Never Shout Never and Hey Monday. Their second album Symphony Soldier was released on August 23, 2011, with its first single "Bad" released to iTunes July 11, 2011 and announced by the band on July 18. The Cab funded the entire album by themselves and left their Fueled by Ramen/Decaydance label, self-releasing Symphony Soldier. AbsolutePunk gave an extremely positive review with a rating of 95%, calling the album a "masterpiece". The pre-orders in the band's webstore featured eleven packages, ranging from $10 to $9,999. Symphony Soldier is digitally available on iTunes, and only available as physical CDs from the band's webstore. The band's latest work, Lock Me Up EP, was released on April 29, 2014.

Studio albums

Extended plays

References

External links
 

Discographies of American artists
Punk rock group discographies